The Volca Beats is a hybrid drum machine produced by the Japanese music technology manufacturer Korg. It was released in April 2013 along with the Volca Keys and Volca Bass. The Beats uses both analogue synthesis and PCM samples to produce drum sounds. 

It is part of Korg's Volca line of affordable synthesizers and drum machines, so has a 16-step sequencer and can run off batteries. It is one of three drum machines/synthesizers in the Volca line, along with the Volca Kick and Volca Drum. The Volca Beats is still being produced, almost 10 years after its initial launch. It retails for around £125.

Release 
The Volca Beats was released in April at Musikmesse Frankfurt 2013 alongside the Volca Keys and Volca Bass. It received mixed review, with MusicRadar stating "The balance between functionality, ease of use and playability is great" and others praising it for its "price, size, portability and sheer concentration of functionality". However, criticism was made specifically of its snare circuit, so much so that people developed simple modifications using a single resistor to improve to quality of the sound.

Review ratings 
8/10 from MusicTech
4/5 (Excellent) from Vintage Synth Explorer
4.5/5 from MusicRadar
4.3/5 on Thomann
Chosen as one of the best budget drum machines by GearNews

Design 
The Volca Beats has a black faceplate, with gold accents and keys; the enclosure is made of black plastic. Its design is partially inspired by the Roland TR-808, TR-606 and Korg's own Electribes.The Volca Beats is compact and lightweight. It features a 16-step sequencer as does all other Volcas, disregarding the Volca Mix. The sequencer has motion sequencing, Korg's version of parameter automation. It also features an "active step" function for fills and build ups. Connection points include 9V DC power, MIDI in, sync in/out and a single stereo output. The Volca can also be powered by AA batteries and has a built in speaker.

Sound engine 
The Volca Beats' sound engine consists of two sections, the analogue drum section and the PCM sample section, along with a "stutter" effect. Stutter is a retrigger, with controls over time and depth. It behaves almost like a delay, retriggering either all voices or a single part. Each section is split up into tracks, of which there are 10 in total (6 analogue, 4 PCM). Each track has a different sound, e.g. Hi-hats, Kick.

Analogue section 
The analogue section is made up of 6 tracks that Korg say are "common analogue vintage circuits":
Kick - a kick circuit that has been likened to an 808, it has 3 controls over Click (transient), Pitch of the kick and Decay.
Snare - seen as the weak point of the Beats. Controls include Pitch, Decay and "Snappy", which controls the amount of white noise in the snare. Lower levels can stand in for a rimshot.
Toms - The Volca Drum has both high and low toms. They have individual tuning but share a decay envelope.
Hats - There are both closed and open hats on the Volca Beats. Each has an individual decay but shares a Grain control, which controls pitch.

PCM sample section 
PCM sample tracks only have control over individual volume and playback speed. There are four different tracks: Clave, Agogo, Clap and Cymbal.

References

External links 
https://www.korg-volca.com/en/ - Korg Volca official website
https://www.korg.com/uk/products/dj/volca_beats/ - Official product page
Drum machines
Korg synthesizers
Grooveboxes